Schools of the Conseil des écoles catholiques du Centre-Est.

Elementary
École élémentaire catholique Édouard-Bond - Enseignement personnalisé
École élémentaire catholique l’Étoile-de-l’Est
École élémentaire catholique la Source - Enseignement personnalisé
École élémentaire catholique Reine-des-Bois
École élémentaire catholique Saint-Joseph d’Orléans
École élémentaire catholique des Voyageurs
École élémentaire catholique Arc-en-ciel
École élémentaire catholique de la Découverte
École élémentaire catholique des Pionniers
École élémentaire catholique Saint-Guillaume
École élémentaire catholique la Vérendrye
École élémentaire catholique Montfort
École élémentaire catholique des Pins
École élémentaire catholique le Petit Prince
École élémentaire catholique Sainte-Anne
École élémentaire catholique Sainte-Marie
École élémentaire catholique Sainte-Kateri
École élémentaire catholique Vision Jeunesse
École élémentaire catholique Georges-Étienne-Cartier
École élémentaire catholique Lamoureux - Enseignement personnalisé
École élémentaire catholique Marius-Barbeau
École élémentaire catholique Notre-Dame-Des-Champs
École élémentaire catholique Sainte-Bernadette
École élémentaire catholique Sainte-Geneviève
École élémentaire catholique Saint-Laurent
École élémentaire catholique Sainte-Thérèse-d’Avila
École élémentaire catholique Élisabeth-Bruyère
École élémentaire catholique J.-L.-Couroux
École élémentaire catholique Laurier-Carrière
École élémentaire catholique Pierre-Elliott-Trudeau
École élémentaire catholique Roger-Saint-Denis
École élémentaire catholique Saint-François-d’Assise
École élémentaire catholique Sainte-Marguerite-Bourgeoys
École élémentaire catholique Jean-Paul II
École élémentaire catholique Terre-des-Jeunes
École élémentaire catholique Jean-Robert Gauthier
École élémentaire catholique Bernard-Grandmaître
École élémentaire catholique Académie catholique Ange Gabrielle
École élémentaire catholique Monseigneur Rémi-Gaulin

High school
École secondaire catholique Béatrice-Desloges, Ottawa
Collège catholique Franco-Ouest, Ottawa
Collège catholique Mer-Bleue, Ottawa
Collège catholique Samuel-Genest, Ottawa
Centre professionel et technique Minto, Ottawa
École secondaire catholique Paul-Desmarais, Ottawa
École secondaire catholique Franco-Cité, Ottawa
École secondaire catholique Garneau, Ottawa
École secondaire catholique Pierre-Savard, Ottawa
École secondaire catholique Marie-Rivier, Kingston 
Académie catholique Ange Gabrielle, Brockville
Centre scolaire catholique Jeanne-Lajoie, Pembroke

See also
List of school districts in Ontario
List of high schools in Ontario

Conseil des écoles catholiques du Centre-Est

1988 establishments in Ontario